H19 or H-19 may refer to:
 H19 (gene), a maternally-transmitted human gene
 British NVC community H19, a type of heath community in the British National Vegetation Classification
 Heathkit H19, a serial terminal used with the Heathkit H8 microcomputer
 Highway H19 (Ukraine)
 , an H-class submarine ordered by but not commissioned into the Royal Navy
 , a Royal Navy H-class destroyer
 London Buses route H19, a public transportation route in London, England
 Sikorsky H-19, an American helicopter